The field hockey events at the 2002 Asian Games were held in Busan, South Korea between 30 September and 12 October 2002. The competition took place at Gangseo Hockey Stadium.

Medalists

Medal table

Draw
The teams were distributed based on their final ranking at the 1998 Asian Games using the serpentine system for their distribution. The women were played in round robin format, five teams registered but Uzbekistan withdrew.

Group A
 (1)
 (4)
 (5)
 (9)

Group B
 (2)
 (3)
 (6)
 (8)

Final standing

Men

Women

References

External links
Official website

 
2002 Asian Games events
2002
Asian Games
2002 Asian Games